Guifaxiang Shibajie Mahua is a traditional pastry, known as one of the “Three traditional snacks of Tianjin” with Gobelieve Bun and Erduoyan Fried cakes. Shibajie Mahua is identified as "Chinese famous snacks".

History 

At the end of the Qing Dynasty, on the west side of Hai River in Tianjin, there was a street called “18th Street (‘Shibajie’ in Chinese)”. A man named Liu Laobao opened a small pastry shop, called “Guifaxiang”. Liu had a unique skill to fry Mahua because of using superior white flour and quality oil. His shop was always full of customers, and soon he opened several other stores. At first there were a lot of guests, but as time went on, people began to feel tired and bored, and business started to slow down, Later, a young shop assistant who just came back from another place, was tired and hungry, and have nothing to eat but little cook's residue. With a suddenly inspiration, he tried to mix residue and Mahua together and fry. The result surprising everyone, new Mahua was not only crisp and tangy but also more delicious than before. According to this method, Liu studied and inserted the mixed crisp to fill Mahua, and tried to use more materials. In order to make Mahua distinctive, enhance taste flavor, and extend the shelf time, the materials were also more and more refined. Today's “Guifaxiang” signs are inscribed by famous calligrapher Zhao Banzhi. Finally, the mixed and stuffed Mahua, became one of the “Three traditional snacks on Tianjin”.

Characteristice 
In the center of each Shibajie Mahua is a muesli pastry with a small mixture of sesame, peach seed, melon seed, green plum, osmanthus and essence water. After forming the Mahua, the peanut oil is put into a small pan to fry through on the small fire, and then add rock candy, sprinkle with melon shred and other materials.

Production

Materials 
Main materials are rock candy, walnut meat, soybean oil and peanut oil, wheat flour, peanut, sesame and Min zingiber.

Step 
1. The day before frying the Mahua, add 500g of yeast with 3.5 kg flour, mix well with 4 heated water, and ferment to become old yeast for use the next day.

2. Use 2 liters of water to turn 3.5 kilograms of sugar, 135 grams of food grade lye and 5 grams of saccharin into sugar water. Set aside.

3. Use 3.5 kg flour and 550-650g hot oil to make shortbread. Set aside.

4. Take 750 grams of flax seed and heat it with boiling water. Keep it dry.

5. Add 3.25 kg of white sugar, 110g of red shreds, 275g of osmanthus, 175g of ginger, 25g of food grade lye, and 1,750 ml of cold water, rub with 500g of dry noodles, mix the noodles until nether too hard, nor too soft. Use 1,000 grams of pavement in the rubbing process.

6. Put the remaining 16 kilograms of dry noodles into the dough mixer, and then add the old yeast sent the day before into the sugar water, and then according to the size of the flour moisture and different seasons, pour a proper amount of cold water, and into the large noodles for later use.

7. Put the large noodles outside until its prepared, then cut it into strips, put them into plodder, pressed into thin noodles. Then pulling growth of about 35 cm short part, and straighten out. One part is used as a strip, and the other part is kneaded and made into strips. Make a crisp with a good pastry. Mix three kind of parts with 5:3:1 match, rub into the Mahua.

8. Pour the oil into the pot, burn to warm with slow fire, put the sesame seeds into the pot for about 20 minutes until it looks like jujube red and straight. After get it out, fill gaps with the rock candy slag, melon bar and other small materials.

References 

Chinese cuisine
Chinese pastries